ADP-ribosylation factor 6 (ARF6) is a member of the ADP ribosylation factor family of GTP-binding proteins.  ARF6 has a variety of cellular functions that are frequently involved in trafficking of biological membranes and transmembrane protein cargo.  ARF6 has specifically been implicated in endocytosis of plasma membrane proteins and also, to a lesser extent, plasma membrane protein recycling.

Function 
This gene encodes a member of the human ARF gene family, which is part of the Ras superfamily. The ARF genes encode small guanine nucleotide-binding proteins that stimulate the ADP-ribosyltransferase activity of cholera toxin and play a role in vesicular trafficking and as activators of phospholipase D. The product of this gene is localized to the plasma membrane, and regulates vesicular trafficking, remodelling of membrane lipids, and signaling pathways that lead to actin remodeling. A pseudogene of this gene is located on chromosome 7.

ARF6 can interact with βarrestin upon receptor activation.

Interactions 
ARF6 has been shown to interact with:

 ARRB1 
 ARFIP2
 CHRM3
 EXOC5
 KIAA0090
 Rac1

References

Further reading

External links 
 
 

Human proteins
Genes on human chromosome 14